Shattuck House may refer to:

Shattuck House, Cazenovia, New York - listed on the National Register of Historic Places
Franklyn C. Shattuck House, Neenah, Wisconsin - listed on the National Register of Historic Places
Edward D. & Vina Shattuck Beals House, Neenah, Wisconsin - listed on the National Register of Historic Places

Buildings and structures disambiguation pages